Naftia (Ναυτία, Greek for Nausea) was a Greek punk band from Salonika formed in 1988. It was the first crust punk band in Greece. They became popular because of their aggressive male and female vocals with metal influenced sound and politically incorrect lyrics.

Discography
 Sex Drugs and Greek Salad - (1988 - live in Oslo)
 Sweet Secret of Life - (1989 - demo)
 European Alienaissance - (1992 - LP)
 Naytia Kinky Horror Show (1994 - split LP. with Graue Zellen)

Members
 Sonia Vlachou (Vocals, Drums)
 Vaggelis Filaitis (Vocals, Bass)
 Ntinos Zoumperis (Vocals, Guitar)

Greek punk rock groups
Musical groups from Thessaloniki